Johann Angelo Ferrari (1806-18 May 1876, Vienna was an Austrian entomologist born in Italy who specialised in Coleoptera especially Scolytidae
He is not to be confused with Pietro Mansueto Ferrari also an entomologist.
He wrote Die Forst- und Baumzuchtschädlichen Borkenkäfer (Tomicides Lac.) aus der Familie der Holzverderber (Scolytides Lac.), mit besonderer Berücksichtigung vorzüglich der europäischen Formen, und der Sammlung der k. k. zoologischen Kabinettes in Wien. Gerolds Sohn, Wien

Austrian entomologists
1806 births
1876 deaths